Harry Cody was the international outdoor amateur speed skating champion in 1914, 1915, and 1916.

Biography
Harry Cody was born in Toronto.

On January 29, 1914 he won the three-mile championship at Saranac Lake, New York beating Bobbie Mclean who dropped out during the race

On February 10, 1916 he won the one-mile championship at Saranac Lake, New York. On February 1, 1917 he came fourth in the one-mile race, losing to Sigurd Larsen of Chicago; fourth in the three-quarter-mile race, also to Sigurd Larsen; and second in the two-mile race, losing to Arthur Staff of Chicago.

Legacy
In 1983 he was inducted into the Speed Skating Canada Hall of Fame.

Footnotes

Canadian male speed skaters
People from Old Toronto
Year of birth missing
Year of death missing